Westdahl Peak, also known as Westdahl Volcano or Mount Westdahl, is a stratovolcano of the Aleutian Range, in the U.S. state of Alaska. The volcano last erupted from November 29, 1991 to January 15, 1992.

It is on Unimak Island, near the western tip of the Alaska Peninsula. The volcano has a second summit, called Faris Peak, which is actually the highest point at 5,426 feet (1,654 m). Westdahl Peak currently has a summit elevation of 5,118 feet (1,560 m).

Other historical eruptions, all attributed to Westdahl by the Alaska Volcano Observatory, have been reported in 1795-1796, 1827-1829, 1951, 1964 and 1978. A couple eruptions were originally reported to be from nearby Pogromni Volcano, but the peak is old, eroded and most likely hasn't erupted since Pleistocene time.

See also
Fisher Caldera — also on Unimak Island.
Alaska Volcano Observatory

References 

 
 Volcanoes of the Alaska Peninsula and Aleutian Islands-Selected Photographs
 Alaska Volcano Observatory

Mountains of Alaska
Aleutian Range
Westdahl
Westdahl Volcano
Mountains of Aleutians East Borough, Alaska
Stratovolcanoes of the United States
Active volcanoes
Volcanoes of Alaska
Holocene stratovolcanoes